The World Championships in Athletics is a biennial event which began in 1983. Organised by the International Association of Athletics Federations (IAAF), the World Championships are a competition comprising track and field athletics events available to male and female athletes from any of the IAAF's 213 member federations. Championship records are set when an athlete achieves the best mark in an event at one of the editions of the Championships. World, area, and national records have been set at the championships over the course of its history.

Competitors at the World Championships come from around the globe and records have been broken by athletes from all six continents. The United States has been the most successful competitor at the World Championships in both medals and records.

Four athletes hold multiple records:
 Usain Bolt holds records in the 100 and 200 metres as well as the 4 x 100 relay
 Michael Johnson holds individual and relay records in the 400 metres
 Jackie Joyner-Kersee broke both the heptathlon and long jump records
 Jarmila Kratochvílová set the records in the 400 and 800 metres at the inaugural Championships in 1983, which are still unbeaten and are the two oldest records of the Championships.

Men

Key to tables:

Note: World records in bold are current world records, those in bold italics are former world records
Statistics are correct as of July 2022

Decathlon disciplines

Women

Note:World records in bold are current world records, those in bold italics are former world records
Statistics are correct as of July 2022
{| class="wikitable unsortable"
!width=12%|Event
!width=6%|Record
!width=13%|Name
!width=13% sortable|Location
!width=10%|Date
!width=2%|Ref
!width=2%|Video
|-
|100 m
|10.67 (+0.8 m/s)
|
| Eugene
|17 July 2022
|
|-
|200 m
|21.45 (+0.6 m/s)
|
| Eugene
|21 July 2022
|
|-
|400 m
|47.99 
|
| Helsinki
|10 August 1983
|
|
|-
|800 m
|1:54.68
|
| Helsinki
|9 August 1983
|
|
|-
|1500 m
|3:51.95 
|
| Doha
|5 October 2019
|
|-
|3000 m(defunct since 1993)
|8:28.71
|
| Stuttgart
|16 August 1993
|
|-
|5000 m
|14:26.72
|
| Doha
|5 October 2019
|
|-
|10000 m
|30:04.18
|
| Paris
|23 August 2003
|
|-
|rowspan="2"|100 m hurdles
|12.12 WR
|
| Eugene
|24 July 2022
|
|-style="background:pink"
|12.06  (+2.5 m/s)
|
| Eugene
|24 July 2022
|
|-
|400 m hurdles
|50.68 WR
|
| Eugene
|22 July 2022
|
|-
|3000 m steeplechase
|8:53.02
|
| Eugene
|20 July 2022
|
|-
|Marathon
|2:18:11
|
| Eugene
|18 July 2022
|
|-
|High jump
|2.09 m 
|
| Rome
|30 August 1987
|
|-
|Pole vault
|5.01 m 
|
| Helsinki
|12 August 2005
|
|-
|Long jump
|7.36 m (+0.4 m/s)
|
| Rome
|4 September 1987
|
|-
|Triple jump
|15.50 m (+0.9 m/s) 
|
| Gothenburg
|10 August 1995
|
|-
|rowspan=2|Shot put
|rowspan=2|21.24 m
|
| Rome
|5 September 1987
|
|-
| 
| Daegu 
|29 August 2011
|
|-
|Discus throw
|71.62|
| Rome
|31 August 1987
|
|-
|Hammer throw
|80.85 m
|
| Beijing
|27 August 2015
|
|-
|rowspan=2|Javelin throw
|71.70 m
|
| Helsinki
|14 August 2005
|
|-style="background:pink"
|71.99 m DQ
|
| Daegu
|2 September 2011
|
|
|-
|rowspan=2|Heptathlon
|7128 pts
|
| Rome
|31 August – 1 September 1987
|
|-
|colspan=5|
|-
|10000 m walk (track)(defunct since 1997)
|42:55.49
|
| Athens
|7 August 1997
|
|-
|10 km walk (road)(defunct since 1995)
|42:13
|
| Gothenburg
|7 August 1995
|
|-
|20 km walk (road)
|1:25:41
|
| Helsinki
|7 August 2005
|
|-
|35 km walk (road)
|2:39:16
|
| Eugene
|22 July 2022
|
|-
|50 km walk (road)
|4:05:56 
|
| London
|13 August 2017
|
|-
|4 × 100 m relay
|41.07
|Veronica Campbell-BrownNatasha MorrisonElaine ThompsonShelly-Ann Fraser-Pryce
| Beijing
|29 August 2015
|
|-
|4 × 400 m relay
|3:16.71
|Gwen TorrenceMaicel Malone-WallaceNatasha Kaiser-BrownJearl Miles
| Stuttgart
|22 August 1993
|
|}

Heptathlon disciplines

Mixed
Note: World records in bold are current world records, those in bold italics''' are former world records

See also
List of world records in athletics
List of Olympic records in athletics
List of Commonwealth Games records in athletics

References

General
Official record tables. IAAF. Retrieved on 2009-06-17.
Competition websites. IAAF. Retrieved on 2009-05-09.

Specific

World Championships
R